The Count of Foix ruled the independent County of Foix, in what is now Southern France, during the Middle Ages. The House of Foix eventually extended its power across the Pyrenees mountain range, joining the House of Bearn and moving their court to Pau in Béarn. The Count Francis Phoebus became King of Navarre in 1479. The last count unified with King Henry IV of France in 1607. 

To this day, the President of France is considered an unofficial successor of the Count (as the current ruler of the French state) as Co-Prince of Andorra.

Gallery of Arms

List of counts of Foix

House of Foix

 1010-1034 : Bernard Roger, count of Couserans, count of Bigorre, lord of Comminges and lord of Foix (second son of Roger I of Carcassonne)

|width=auto| Roger I1034–1064
| 
| ?second son of Bernard-Roger and Garsenda, Countess of Bigorre
| never married
| c. 1064
|-
|width=auto| Pierre-Bernard1064–1071
| 
| ?third son of Bernard-Roger and Garsenda, Countess of Bigorre
| Ledgardetwo son
| c. 1071
|-
|width=auto| Roger II1071–1124
| 
| ?eldest son of Pierre-Bernard and Ledgarde
| (1) Sicarda1073no issues (2) Stephanie of Besalúfour children
| c. 1124
|-
|width=auto| Roger III1124–1148
| 
| ?eldest son of Roger II and Stephanie of Besalú
| (1) ?one daughter (2) Jimena of Barcelonabef. 8 July 1130two children
| c. 1148
|-
|width=auto| Roger-Bernard I1148–1188
| 
| c. 1130only son of Roger III and Jimena of Barcelona
| Cecilia of Béziers11 July 1151five children
| November 1188aged 57–58
|-
|width=auto| Raymond-Roger1188–1223
| 
| c. 1152second son of Roger-Bernard I and Cecilia of Béziers
| Philippa of Montcada1189two children
| 27 March 1223Château de Mirepoixaged 70–71
|-
|width=auto| Roger-Bernard II1223–1241
| 
| c. 1195only son of Raymond-Roger and Philippa of Montcada
| (1) Ermesinda, Viscountess of Castelbón10 January 1203two children (2) Ermengarde of Narbonne23 January 1232one daughter
| 26 May 1241aged 45–46
|-
|width=auto| Roger IV1241–1265
| 
| ?only son of Roger-Bernard II and Ermesinda, Viscountess of Castelbón
| Brunissenda of Cardona17 February 1231five children
| 24 February 1265
|-
|width=auto| Roger-Bernard III1265–1302
| 
| c. 1243eldest son of Roger IV and Brunissenda of Cardona
| Margaret, Viscountess of Béarn14 October 1252Tarn-et-Garonnefive children
| 3 March 1302aged 59
|-
|}

House of Foix-Béarn

|width=auto| Gaston I1302–1315 
| 
| c. 1287only son of Roger-Bernard III and Margaret, Viscountess of Béarn
| Joan of ArtoisOctober 1301Senlissix children
| 13 December 1315Maubuisson Abbey, Pontoiseaged 27–28
|-
|width=auto| Gaston II1315–1343 
| 
| c. 1308eldest son of Gaston I and Joan of Artois
| Eleanor of Comminges1327one son
| 26 September 1343Sevilleaged 34–35
|-
|width=auto| Gaston III Phoebus1343–1391
| 
| 30 April 1331Orthezonly son of Gaston II and Eleanor of Comminges
| Agnes of NavarreParis4 August 1349one son
| 1 August 1391L'Hôpital-d'Orionaged 60
|-
|width=auto| Matthew1391–1398
| 
| c. 1363second son of Roger Bernard IV, Viscount of Castelbon and Gerauda of Navailles
| Joanna of Aragon4 June 1392Barcelonano issues
| August 1398aged 34–35
|-
|width=auto| Isabella1398–1428with Archambaud (1398–1412)with John I (1412–1428)
| 
| bef. 2 November 1361only daughter of Roger Bernard IV, Viscount of Castelbon and Gerauda of Navailles
| rowspan="2"| 1381five children
| c. 1428aged 46+
|-
|width=auto| Archambaud de Grailly1398–1412with Isabella
| 
| c. 1329-1330second son of Pierre II de Grailly and Erembourga de Périgord
| c. 1412aged 81–83
|-
|}

House of Foix-Grailly

|width=auto| John I1412–1436with Isabella (1412–1428)
| 
| c. 1382eldest son of Archambaud and Isabella
| (1) Joan of Navarre12 November 1402Royal Palace of Oliteno issues (2) Jeanne d'Albret23 May 1422two sons (3) Joanna of UrgellMay 1436no issues
| 4 May 1436Mazères, Ariègeaged 53–54
|-
|width=auto| Gaston IV1436–1472
| 
| 27 November 1422eldest son of John I and Jeanne d'Albret
| Eleanor of Navarre30 July 1436ten children
| 25/28 July 1472Roncevallesaged 49
|-
|width=auto| Francis Phoebus1472–1483
| 
| November/December 1466only son of Gaston of Foix, Prince of Viana and Magdalena of Valois
| never married
| 30 January 1483Pamplonaaged 16
|-
|width=auto| Catherine1483–1517with John II
| 
| 1468only daughter of Gaston of Foix, Prince of Viana and Magdalena of Valois
| rowspan="2"| 14 July 1484Palacio Real de Olitethirteen children
| 12 February 1517Mont-de-Marsanaged 48–49
|-
|width=auto| John II1484–1516with Catherine
| 
| 1469second son of Alain I of Albret and Françoise, Countess of Périgord
| 14 June 1516Château de Pauaged 46–47
|-
|}

House of Albret

|width=auto| Henry I1517–1555
| 
| 18 April 1503Sangüesathird son of John II and Catherine
| Margaret of Angoulême24 January 1527Saint-Germain-en-Layetwo children
| 25 May 1555Hagetmauaged 52
|-
|width=auto| Joan1555–1572with Anthony
| 
| 7 January 1528Saint-Germain-en-Laye only daughter of Henry I and Margaret of Angoulême
| (1) William, Duke of Jülich-Cleves-Berg14 June 1541Château de Châtelleraultno issues(2) Anthony of Navarre20 October 1548Moulins en Bourbonnais, Allierfive children
| 9 June 1572Parisaged 44
|-
|width=auto| Anthony1555-1562with Joan
| 
| 22 April 1518La Fère, Picardy second son of Charles, Duke of Vendôme and Françoise of Alençon
| Joan20 October 1548Moulins en Bourbonnais, Allierfive children
| 17 November 1562Les Andelys, Eureaged 44
|-
|}

House of Bourbon

|width=auto| Henry II1572–1607
| 
| 13 December 1553Château de Pausecond son of Anthony and Joan
|(1) Margaret of Valois18 August 1572Notre Dame Cathedral, Parisno issues(2) Marie de' Medici17 December 1600Lyonsix children
| 14 May 1610Parisaged 56
|-
|}
In 1607 the county of Foix was reunited to the French crown.

See also
 Foix
 Castle of Foix
 County of Foix
 List of Co-Princes of Andorra
 Diana of Foix
 List of Navarrese monarchs from the House of Foix
 Navarre monarchs family tree

External links

 Histoire des Comtes de Foix
 Medieval History of Navarre

 
House of Foix
Foix